Mari Fasting (born 1 March 1985) is a Norwegian orienteering competitor and ski mountaineer. She is two times Junior World Orienteering Champion. She represents the club NTNUI of Trondheim, and is related to the ski mountaineer Ola Berger.

Junior career
Mari Fasting competed at the 2005 Junior World Orienteering Championships in Tenero, where she received a gold medal in the long distance and a gold medal in the relay event.

Senior career
Fasting participated at the 2006 World Orienteering Championships in Aarhus, where she finished 6th in the middle distance. She was injured for a large part of the 2007 season, and missed the world championship. At the 2008 European Orienteering Championships in Ventspils she finished 4th in the relay event with the Norwegian national team.

She competed at the 2013 World Orienteering Championships, and won a gold medal in the relay with the Norwegian team, together with Heidi Bagstevold and Anne Margrethe Hausken Nordberg.

Ski mountaineering 
 2011:
 8th, World Championship relay, together with Ingvild Ryggen Carstens and Malene Haukøy
 10th, World Championship vertical race

References

External links

1985 births
Living people
Norwegian orienteers
Female orienteers
Foot orienteers
World Orienteering Championships medalists
Norwegian female ski mountaineers
World Games bronze medalists
Competitors at the 2009 World Games
World Games medalists in orienteering
21st-century Norwegian women
Junior World Orienteering Championships medalists